The World Outside is the second album from Scottish brother band The MacDonald Brothers. It was recorded in Glasgow, Scotland, and released on 15 October 2007 by their record label Syco. It entered the UK Albums Chart at number 41 with first week sales of 5,126.

Background
The album was the band's second studio album to be released, after their 2007 debut released the same year in April 2007 entitled The Macdonald Brothers. The World Outside features mostly of covers, mostly Scottish songs such as "Saturday Night" by Bay City Rollers with various others. The song "Runaway (Do You Love Me)" was written by Elton John. The song was released as a single from the album in 2007.

Recording
The recording for the album is said to have taken place sometime since the release of their 2007 self-titled debut album, which was released in April 2007, and to the release of this album in October 2007. The album was released through Syco Records and Sony Music Entertainment.

Critical reception
HMV said:
 Second album by the 2006 X-Factor finalists Brian and Craig, the inimitable MacDonald Brothers. A crowd-pleasing poppy selection of original tracks and cover versions, this album will appeal to fans of artists such as Simply Red, The Proclaimers and Wet Wet Wet. Includes the tracks 'Somethin' About You', 'Saturday Night' and 'I Want You To Want Me', and also includes a bonus DVD that includes two extra tracks and a fly-on-the wall documentary of the duo's rise to fame.

Track listing

Normal edition CD
"Close Encounters"
"Saturday Night"
"Somethin' About You"
"Earthbound"
"When I'm Dead and Gone"
"You and I"
"I Want You to Want Me"
"Breakaway"
"Come Back Susannah"
"I Found a Place"
"Trick of the Light"
"Na Na Na Song"
"Please Stay"
"Runaway (Do You Love Me)" [bonus track]
"I Find the Answer" [bonus track]

DVD
"Can't Take My Eyes Off You"
"Don't Worry Baby"
"MacDonald Bros Story" [documentary]

Chart performance

References

External links
 Macdonald Bros Official Website

The MacDonald Brothers albums
2007 albums